Thirimadura Ranjith de Zoysa (3 May 1962 – 4 December 2019) was a Sri Lankan politician and member of the Parliament of Sri Lanka. He was a member of the Sri Lanka Freedom Party and Sri Lanka Podujana Peramuna. He died on 4 December 2019 while receiving treatments at a hospital in Singapore for a cardiac condition.

Early life
Zoysa was born to a family of seven children from Elpitiya, Godakawela, on 3 May 1962. He obtained primary education from Siddhartha Vidyalaya in Elpitiya, secondary education from Rahula College in Elpitiya, and later studied agriculture in Aquinas University College.

Political career 
In the late 1980s, motivated at the time by the radical political wave of the JVP, Zoysa entered politics. He was later elected chairman of Atakalampanna Pradeshiya Sabha in 1997 and appointed chairman of the same Pradeshiya Sabha as opposition leader in 2002. Zoysa was elected to the Sabaragamuwa Provincial Council in 2004 and 2008, where he held many positions of provincial minister.

He was first elected from the Rakwana Electorate to the Parliament in 2010, and re-elected from the same electorate in 2015. He later served as the Joint Opposition's deputy national organizer.

In the last presidential election, he played a major role in President Gotabaya Rajapaksa's victory.

Controversies 
He was arrested over assaulting a person on 20 December 2018 and remanded until 1 January 2019.

References

1962 births
2019 deaths
Members of the 14th Parliament of Sri Lanka
Members of the 15th Parliament of Sri Lanka
Sinhalese politicians
Sri Lanka Freedom Party politicians
United People's Freedom Alliance politicians
Alumni of Aquinas College of Higher Studies